The Slingsby T.7 Kirby Cadet is a British training glider designed and built by Slingsby that first flew in 1935 and saw service with the Royal Air Force for use by the Air Training Corps as the Cadet TX.1 throughout the 1950, 1960s and 1970s.

Design and development
The T.7 was developed to specification 20/43 from the civilian Kirby Kadet to meet an Air Ministry requirement for a training glider as part of the air cadet programme, and it entered service as the Cadet TX.1 with the Royal Air Force. It was further developed with a change of wing into the T.8 Kirby Tutor (service name Cadet TX.2) which in turn was developed into a two-seat version the T.31B Tandem Tutor (service name Cadet TX.3).
One saw service in SLAF from 1957-1959.

Former operators

Royal Air Force

Royal Ceylon Air Force

Specifications

See also

Notes

References

External links

 Sailplane Directory

1930s British sailplanes
Glider aircraft
Kirby Cadet
Aircraft first flown in 1935
Parasol-wing aircraft